Kizzy is the name given to the 1976 BBC adaptation of Rumer Godden's 1972 novel The Diddakoi (a.k.a. The Gypsy Girl). It starred Vanessa Furst as the title character and was produced by Dorothea Brooking.

It is the story of an orphan traveller or Romani girl called Kizzy, who faces persecution, grief and loss in a hostile, close-knit village community. This is a moving tale of human fallibility and sorrow, but also of strength, courage and redemption.

Cast

Adaptations
The story has also been adapted as a BBC radio drama The Diddakoi.
This adaptation features Nisa Cole.

References

External links

 

BBC children's television shows
1970s British children's television series
Films based on works by Rumer Godden
Television shows based on British novels